Sarah George is an American politician and prosecutor from the state of Vermont. A member of the Democratic Party, she has served as the State's Attorney of Chittenden County since 2017. She has pursued criminal justice reform in office, avoiding seeking cash bail and discouraging the practice of non-public safety traffic stops, and was identified by CNN as part of a wave of progressive candidates running for prosecutorial positions in the United States.

Elections
George was appointed to the position in 2017 when her predecessor T.J. Donovan left office after being elected Attorney General of Vermont. She won a full term in 2018 with 99.1% of the vote. In 2022, she was challenged in the Democratic primary by Ted Kenney, a member of the Williston Board of Selectmen who claimed that George's policies made the county less safe. Kenney was supported by multiple police unions, and the Vermont Republican Party encouraged Republicans to request a Democratic ballot so they could vote against George. However, George easily prevailed in the primary, defeating Kenney by a 53%-33% margin. She was unopposed in the general election.

References

State's attorneys in Vermont
Vermont Democrats
Vermont lawyers
Living people
Women in Vermont politics
21st-century American lawyers
21st-century American women lawyers
21st-century American politicians
21st-century American women politicians
People from Chittenden County, Vermont
Year of birth missing (living people)